Narrawa is a locality in western New South Wales, Australia.

References

External links

Upper Lachlan Shire
Towns in New South Wales
Southern Tablelands